"Foxy Foxy" is the first promotional single off of Rob Zombie's third solo album Educated Horses. It features a more hard rock-based sound than his previous releases. The lyrics contain a reference to Lon Chaney Sr.'s He Who Gets Slapped. The song can be heard on the April 13, 2006, episode of The O.C., entitled "The Dawn Patrol". It was also used for Candice Michelle's Playboy Cover Unveiling on the March 6, 2006 episode of WWE Monday Night Raw.

Music video
The music video of "Foxy Foxy" shows Zombie and his new band playing on a stage in a somewhat desolate area. Then various girls, including Sheri Moon, arrive in cars and begin dancing to the song. This video can be found on the bonus DVD included with The Best of Rob Zombie.

Personnel
 Tom Baker - Mastering
 Chris Baseford - Engineer
 Blasko - Bass, Background Vocals
 Tommy Clufetos - Drums, Background Vocals
 Scott Humphrey - Producer
 John 5 - Guitar, Background Vocals
 Will Thompson - Assistant Engineer
 Rob Zombie - Vocals, Lyricist, Producer, Art Direction

Chart positions

Covers and samples
Angels of Modern Destruction sampled "Foxy Foxy" for their song "Lapdance".

Rob Zombie songs
2006 singles
Songs written by Rob Zombie
Songs written by Scott Humphrey
2006 songs
Geffen Records singles